Italy competed at the 1997 Mediterranean Games in Bari, Italy.

Medals

See also
 Boxing at the 1997 Mediterranean Games
 Football at the 1997 Mediterranean Games
 Judo at the 1997 Mediterranean Games
 Volleyball at the 1997 Mediterranean Games
 Water polo at the 1997 Mediterranean Games

References

External links
 Mediterranean Games Athletics results at Gbrathletics.com
 1997 - BARI (ITA) at CIJM web site

Nations at the 1997 Mediterranean Games
1997
Mediterranean Games